Maharaja of Jeypore was the principal title used by the rulers of the Kingdom of Jeypore until its dissolution in 1947. It was also used by the titular rulers until the removal of titles and privileges of all princely states and estates by the 26th amendment of the Constitution of India. However, due to the significance given to the traditional and religious role of a king, evidently, Vishweshwar Dev in 2013 became the Maharaja of Jeypore in pretense.

An ancient branch of Solar dynasty or Suryavansh began ruling the little kingdom of Nandapur in 1443, when Vinayak Dev, the Suryavanshi prince of North Kashmir married Lilavati, the daughter of the Shilavanshi king of Nandapur, Pratap Ganga Raju. The first three rulers served as the vassals of the mighty Gajapati Kingdom until the reign of Vishwanath Dev Gajapati (1527-1571) who formed a large sovereign kingdom and ruled from the new capital, Rayagada. The kingdom maintained its sovereignty for much of its history, however, in some intervals it also served as a Tributary state of the Qutb Shahis (1571-1674) and the British (1777-1947).

The eighth ruler of the dynasty, Veer Vikram Dev (1637-1669) shifted the capital from Nandapur to newly founded Jeypore. His descendants were successful in creating a significant kingdom with numerous feudatories that paid homage to the royal throne. As per historical sources, Vishwambhar Dev is considered the father of the feudal system of Jeypore kingdom. Many feudatories established by him exist to this day, some examples can be - Salur, Pachipenta, Chemudu, Golugonda, Khariar etc. The eleventh ruler, Mallikamardhan Krishna defeated the combined forces of the French East India Company and the Qutb Shahi commander, Malik Mohammad.

The advent of British did put the dynasty of the Maharajas in jeopardy as the 19th ruler, Vikram Dev was defeated and all of his territories were occupied by the British and were granted to his rival, the Maharaja of Vizianagaram. However, the resilience of the natives of Jeypore and the rising number of violent protests forced the British government to reaffirm Vikram Dev as the ruler but as a tributary estate holder or Zamindar in a permanent settlement of 24,000 rupees. The title of 'Maharaja' was abolished and a new title of 'Raja' was granted to the first three kings of the newly formed Jeypore Samasthanam zamindari. These kings were - Vikram Dev, Ram Chandra Dev II and Vikram Dev II. Later, the British government granted Ram Chandra Dev III the title of 'Maharaja' as a personal distinction and so were the next three kings - Vikram Dev III, Ram Chandra Dev IV and Vikram Dev IV.

Genealogy of Shankar Dynasty (Suryavansh)

References

History of India
Constitution of India